Panorama Porno is the ninth studio album by the Japanese pop-rock band Porno Graffitti. It was released on March 28, 2012.

Track listing

References

2012 albums
Porno Graffitti albums
Japanese-language albums
Sony Music albums